Nucula crystallina is a species of marine bivalvia mollusk in the family Nuculidae.

Original description
Poppe G.T., Tagaro S.P. & Stahlschmidt P. (2015). New shelled molluscan species from the central Philippines I. Visaya. 4(3): 15-59.
page(s): 35, pl. 14 figs 1-3.

References

External links
 Worms Link

Nuculidae